Bonnaire is a surname. Notable people with the surname include:

Julien Bonnaire (born 1978), French rugby union player
Olivier Bonnaire (born 1983), French cyclist
Sandrine Bonnaire (born 1967), French actress, film director, and screenwriter

See also
 Bonaire (disambiguation)